Montrose Jonas Moses (September 2, 1878 – March 29, 1934) was an American writer, born in New York, where he graduated from the City College in 1899.

In the main, his compositions were directed towards children's literature; however, he composed some books for adults, as well. Between 1900 and 1910 he was connected editorially with, or was a contributor to, various periodicals: the Literary Digest, the Reader, the Independent, the Book News Monthly. Besides editing the Green Room Book and the Anglo-American Dramatic Register and making some translations from the French, he wrote: Famous Actor Families in America (1906); Children's Books and Reading (1907); Henrik Ibsen (1908); The Literature of the South (1909); The American Dramatist (1911); Maurice Maeterlinck: A Study (1911). He edited Representative Plays by American Dramatists: 1856–1911 (1920).

Moses was a friend of Harry Houdini.

References 

Joseph M. Flora, Amber Vogel, Bryan Albin Giemza - Southern writers: a new biographical dictionary

External links

 
 

American literary critics
American children's writers
American biographers
American translators
French–English translators
Writers from New York City
City College of New York alumni
1878 births
1934 deaths
Historians from New York (state)